The Cachoeirinha River is a river in the São Paulo state in southeastern Brazil.

See also
List of rivers of São Paulo

References
Brazilian Ministry of Transport

Rivers of São Paulo (state)